Graham Brody (born 29 October 1993) is a Gaelic footballer from County Laois.

He made his Laois senior inter county debut in 2014 having starred at minor and under-21 level in previous years.

He received an All-Star nomination in 2018 following a season in which he appeared in the Leinster SFC final and played in the Round 4 qualifier against Monaghan.

References

1993 births
Living people
Gaelic football goalkeepers
Laois inter-county Gaelic footballers
Portlaoise Gaelic footballers